Little Swatara Creek (once known as Jackson Creek) is a  tributary of Swatara Creek in  southeast Pennsylvania in the United States.

The creek rises on Blue Mountain in Berks County north of Strausstown and flows west-southwest.

Little Swatara Creek joins Swatara Creek in the borough of Jonestown in Lebanon County.

See also
List of rivers of Pennsylvania

References

Rivers of Pennsylvania
Tributaries of Swatara Creek
Rivers of Lebanon County, Pennsylvania